Woodland station, also known as Zermatt and Morstein station, is a historic railway station located in West Whiteland Township, Chester County, Pennsylvania. It started as a two-story brick building constructed by the West Chester Railroad in the 1870s.  It was enlarged in 1889, with a two-story, frame addition with vertical novelty siding. It is now part of a corporate campus.

It was listed on the National Register of Historic Places in 1984 as Woodland Station.

References

External links
Existing Railroad Stations in Chester County, Pennsylvania

Railway stations on the National Register of Historic Places in Pennsylvania
Railway stations in the United States opened in 1889
Transportation buildings and structures in Chester County, Pennsylvania
National Register of Historic Places in Chester County, Pennsylvania
1889 establishments in Pennsylvania